Francesco Monterosso (born 20 April 1991 in Adelaide) is an Australian former professional soccer player.

Club career
On 3 June 2009 he was signed to a two-year deal by Adelaide United after scoring 13 goals in 19 appearances for their inaugural National Youth League squad.

On 16 August 2009 he made his senior debut for Adelaide, coming off the bench in the 84th minute against Sydney FC.

He has signed with MetroStars for the 2011 South Australian Super league. Monterosso capped off an impressive return to his former club with a brace of goals against the Modbury Jets in the Carlsberg Cup.

A-League career statistics
(Correct as of 19 March 2011)

Honours
Personal honours:
 National Youth League Top Scorer: 2008–2009 with Adelaide United – 13 goals
 National Youth League Top Scorer: 2009–2010 with Adelaide United – 17 goals

References

External links
 Adelaide United profile

1991 births
Living people
Australian people of Italian descent
Australian soccer players
Adelaide United FC players
Soccer players from Adelaide
A-League Men players
FFSA Super League players
North Eastern MetroStars SC players
Association football forwards
South Australian Sports Institute soccer players